Shorewood Hills is an unincorporated community in Garland County, Arkansas, United States. It is the location of two places listed on the National Register of Historic Places:
Couchwood, Address Restricted, Shorewood Hills
Little Switzerland (Shorewood Hills, Arkansas), Address Restricted, Shorewood Hills

Unincorporated communities in Garland County, Arkansas
Unincorporated communities in Arkansas